Separatista helicoides is a species of sea snail, a marine gastropod mollusk in the family Capulidae.

Description

Distribution
This species can be found in the Indian Ocean off the Mascarene Basin.
Queensland, Australia.

References

 
 Drivas, J. & M. Jay (1988). Coquillages de La Réunion et de l'île Maurice
 Steyn, D.G. & Lussi, M. (1998) Marine Shells of South Africa. An Illustrated Collector’s Guide to Beached Shells. Ekogilde Publishers, Hartebeespoort, South Africa, ii + 264 pp. page(s): 46

Capulidae
Gastropods described in 1791
Taxa named by Johann Friedrich Gmelin